Laniisoma is a genus of passerine birds in the family Tityridae.

The genus contains two species:

References

 
Bird genera
Taxonomy articles created by Polbot